Patrice Bergues (born 12 February 1948) is a retired French football striker and later manager.

References

1948 births
Living people
French footballers
Association football forwards
French football managers
RC Lens managers
Liverpool F.C. non-playing staff
French expatriate sportspeople in England
Olympique Lyonnais non-playing staff
US Saint-Omer players
US Nœux-les-Mines players